Pang is a village in Malappuram district in the state of Kerala, India.

Location
The place can be reached from Perinthalmanna via Angadippuram-Puzhakkattiri- Padapparambu route and from Kottakkal via Indianoor- Pang Chendi route.
From kottakkal via Kadampuzha-padapparambu-Perintalmanna route.

Beauty

The village is very beautiful surrounded by greeny hills. The Place is mentioned by the famous traveller and writer S. K. Pottekkatt as the beautiful village in Malappuram district in his book. The old people say that the place is blessed with 72'cholas' (small ponds and water origins hillsides) and made off with 72 'moolas' (corners) and many fields.

Also the place is known as the birth place of pangil ahamed kutty musliar who was one of the founding member of samastha.
And The village was pointed out in william logan’s  malabar manual

The village is also have a strong connection with maamaangam.the warriors who fought against calicut samoothiri for valluvanad konathiri was from this beautiful village.

People
This place is a Muslim majority area, more than 80 percent of the total community is Muslims, the rest of the people are Hindu believers. Though the demographic status shows like this, there is no report of communal issues challenging the secular harmony of the land.

Culture
Pang village is a predominantly Muslim populated area. Hindus exist in comparatively smaller numbers. So the culture of the locality is based on Muslim traditions. Duff Muttu, Kolkali, Oppana and Aravanamuttu are common folk arts of this locality. There are many libraries attached to mosques giving a rich source of Islamic studies. Some of the books are written in Arabi-Malayalam which is a version of the Malayalam language written in Arabic script. People gather in mosques for the evening prayer and continue to sit there after the prayers discussing social and cultural issues. Business and family issues are also sorted out during these evening meetings. The Hindu minority of this area keeps their rich traditions by celebrating various festivals in their temples. Hindu rituals are done here with a regular devotion like other parts of Kerala.

Transportation
Pang village connects to other parts of India through Kottakkal town. National highway No.66 passes through Tanur and the northern stretch connects to Goa and Mumbai. The southern stretch connects to Cochin and Trivandrum. State Highway No.28 starts from Nilambur and connects to Ooty, Mysore and Bangalore through Highways.12,29 and 181. National Highway No.966 connects to Palakkad and Coimbatore. The nearest airport is at Karipur. The nearest major railway station is at Tirur.

References

Villages in Malappuram district
Kottakkal area